George Herdman Benson (26 June 1893 – 19 December 1974) was an English footballer who played as a winger in the Football League for Accrington Stanley, Blackburn Rovers, Stalybridge Celtic, Queen's Park Rangers, and Port Vale; he also played in the Lancashire Combination for Chorley.

Career
Benson played for Accrington Stanley, Blackburn Rovers, Stalybridge Celtic and Queen's Park Rangers, before joining Port Vale on a one-month trial in February 1924. He appeared at The Old Recreation Ground in a 2–0 defeat to Bristol City in a Second Division match on 9 February, and failed to impress. He was not kept on at the club, and instead joined Lancashire Combination club Chorley.

Career statistics
Source:

References

People from Garstang
English footballers
Association football wingers
Accrington Stanley F.C. (1891) players
Blackburn Rovers F.C. players
Stalybridge Celtic F.C. players
Queens Park Rangers F.C. players
Port Vale F.C. players
Chorley F.C. players
English Football League players
1893 births
1974 deaths